Yazidi organizations

Iraq
Yazidi Movement for Reform and Progress
Sinjar Alliance
Protection Force of Sinjar 
Sinjar Resistance Units
Êzidxan Women's Units
Asayîşa Êzîdxanê

United States of America and Canada 
Yazda
Nadia’s Initiative

Germany
Yazidi Academy

References